The 1976 CECAFA Cup was the fourth edition of the tournament. It was held in Zanzibar, Tanzania, and was won by Uganda. The matches were played between November 6 and 14.

Group A

Group B

Semi-finals

Final

References
RSSSF info

CECAFA Cup
CECAFA
1976 in Tanzanian sport